Novgorodsky Uyezd (Новгородский уезд) was one of the subdivisions of the Novgorod Governorate of the Russian Empire. It was situated in the southwestern part of the governorate. Its administrative centre was Veliky Novgorod.

Demographics
At the time of the Russian Empire Census of 1897, Novgorodsky Uyezd had a population of 185,757. Of these, 92.6% spoke Russian, 2.4% Latvian, 1.4% German, 1.1% Yiddish, 1.1% Polish, 0.4% Estonian, 0.4% Lithuanian, 0.2% Belarusian, 0.2% Finnish, 0.1% Tatar, 0.1% Ukrainian and 0.1% Karelian as their native language.

References

 
Uezds of Novgorod Governorate
Novgorod Governorate